A number of new world records and Olympic records were set in various events at the 2004 Summer Olympics.

Archery

World records (and Olympic records)
Men's individual (70 m, 72 arrow): South Korea's Im Dong-hyun, 687 points
previous record of 685 was set in 1995 by Young Sung Shim and tied in 1996 by Kyo Moon Oh (August 12)
Women's individual (70 m, 72 arrow): South Korea's Park Sung-hyun, 682 points (August 12)
previous record of 679 was set in 2004 by Natalia Valeeva
Women's team (70 m, 216 arrow): South Korea's Lee Sung Jin, Park Sung Hyun, Yun Mi Jin, 2030 points (August 12)
previous record of 1994 was set at 2000 Games by South Korean team

Olympic records
Men's Individual (70 m, 18 arrow): Korea's Park Kyung Mo, 173 points
previous record of 172 was set in 2000 by Jang Yong Ho
Women's Individual (70 m, 18 arrow): Korea's Yun Mi Jin, 173 points (tied record)
previous record of 173 was set in 2000 by Yun Mi Jin

Athletics

World records (and Olympic records)
Men's 110 m hurdles: China's Liu Xiang, 12.91 s (tied) (August 27)
record of 12.91 s was set in August 1993 by Colin Jackson
Women's pole vault: Yelena Isinbayeva of Russia, 4.91 m (August 18)
previous record of 4.90 m set by Isinbayeva

Cycling

World records (and Olympic records)
Women's 500 m time trial: Australia's Anna Meares, 33.952 s (August 20)
previous record of 34.000 s was set in August 2002 by Yonghua Jiang
Women's individual pursuit: New Zealand's Sarah Ulmer, 3:24.537 (August 22)
This record was broken multiple times during these Games, the prior instances being:
New Zealand's Sarah Ulmer, 3:26.400 (August 21)
Australia's Katie Mactier, 3:29.945 (August 21)
previous record of 3:30.604 was set in May by Ulmer
Men's team pursuit: Australia's Graeme Brown, Brett Lancaster, Bradley McGee, Luke Roberts, 3:56.610 (August 22)
previous record of 3:59:583 was set in 2002 by Australian team

Rowing

World records (and Olympic records)
Note: rowing records are not official due to variable course conditions.
Women's lightweight double sculls: Australia's Sally Newmarch and Amber Halliday, 6:49.90 (unofficial) (August 15)
previous record of 6:50.63 was set in 1995 by Berit Christoffersen and Lene Andersson
Men's 8-man boat: United States team, 5:19.85 (unofficial) (August 15)
previous record of 5:22.80 was set in 1999 by Netherlands team
Women's 8-man boat: United States team, 5:56.55 (unofficial) (August 15)
previous record of 5:57.02 was set in 1999 by Romanian team

Shooting

World records (and Olympic records)
Men's 10 m air rifle: China's Zhu Qinan, 702.7 points (August 16)
previous record of 702.5 was set in June 2003 by Jason Parker
Men's 10 m running target (30+30 shots): Germany's Manfred Kurzer, 590 points (August 19)
previous record of 588 was set in May 2002 by Igor Kolesov, and tied in July 2002 by Yang Ling

Olympic records
Men's 10 m Air Rifle (Qualification): China's Zhu Qinan, 599 points
previous record of 596 was set in 1996 by Wolfram Waibel
Men's 10 m Air Rifle (Final): Zhu, 702.7 points
previous record of 696.4 was set in 2000 by Cai Yalin
Men's 10 m Air Pistol (Qualification): Russia's Mikhail Nestruev, 591 points
previous record of 590 was set in 2000 by Franck Dumoulin
Men's 10 m Air Pistol (Final): China's Wang Yifu, 690.0 points
previous record of 688.9 was set in 2000 by Dumoulin
Men's Trap (Qualification): Russia's Aleksei Alipov, 124 hits (tied record)
previous record of 124 was set in 1996 by Michael Diamond
Men's Trap (Final): Alipov, 149 hits (tied record)
previous record of 149 was set in 1996 by Diamond
Men's Double Trap (Qualification): United Arab Emirates's Ahmed Al-Maktoum, 144 hits
previous record of 143 was set in 2000 by Russell Mark
Men's Double Trap (Final): Almaktoum, 189 hits (tied record)
previous record of 189 was set in 1996 by Mark
Men's Skeet (Qualification): Finland's Marko Kemppainen, 125 hits (tied record)
previous record of 125 was set in 1996 by Ennio Falco
Men's 10 m Running Target (Qualification): Germany's Manfred Kurzer, 590 points
previous record of 585 was set in 1996 by Yang Ling
Women's 50 m Rifle Three positions (Final): Russia's Lioubov Galkina, 688.4 points
previous record of 686.1 was set in 1996 by Aleksandra Ivosev
Women's 10 m Air Rifle (Qualification): Russia's Galkina, 399 points
previous record of 397 was set in 1996 by Petra Horneber
Women's 10 m Air Rifle (Final): China's Du Li, 502.0 points
previous record of 498.2 was set in 1992 by Yeo Kab-Soon
Women's 25 m Pistol (Final): Bulgaria's Mariya Grozdeva, 688.2 points
established new record after rule change

Swimming

World records (and Olympic records)
Women's 100 m freestyle: Australia's Jodie Henry, 53.52 s (August 18)
previous record of 53.66 s was set in March 2004 by Libby Lenton
Men's 400 m medley: United States's Michael Phelps, 4:08.26 (August 14)
previous record of 4:08.41 was set in July 2004 by Phelps
Men's 4 × 100 m freestyle: South Africa's Roland Schoeman, Darien Townsend, Lyndon Ferns, Ryk Neethling, 3:13.17 (August 15)
previous record of 3:13.67 was set at 2000 Games by Australian team
Women's 4 × 100 m freestyle: Australia's Alice Mills, Libby Lenton, Petria Thomas, Jodie Henry, 3:35.94 (August 14)
previous record of 3:36.00 was set in July 2002 by German team
Men's 4 × 100 m medley: United States's Aaron Peirsol, Brendan Hansen, Ian Crocker, Jason Lezak, 3:30.68 (August 21)
previous record of 3:31.54 was set in July 2003 by United States team
Backstroke leg of Men's 4 × 100 m medley: United States's Aaron Peirsol, 53.45 s (August 21)
previous record of 53.60 s was set in August 1999 by Lenny Krayzelburg
Women's 4 × 100 m medley: Australia's Jodie Henry, Leisel Jones, Giaan Rooney, Petria Thomas, 3:57.32 (August 21)
previous record of 3:58.30 was set at 2000 Games by United States team
Women's 4 × 200 m freestyle: United States's Natalie Coughlin, Carly Piper, Dana Vollmer, Kaitlin Sandeno, 7:53.42 (August 18)
previous record of 7:55.47 was set in August 1987 by East German team

Weightlifting

World records (and Olympic records)
Women's under 48 kg (total): Turkey's Nurcan Taylan, 210.0 kg (August 14)
previous record of 207.5 kg was set in November 2002 by Mingjuan Wang
Women's under 48 kg (snatch): Turkey's Nurcan Taylan, 97.5 kg (August 14)
previous record of 93.5 kg was set in September 2003 by Zhou Li
Women's 58–63 kg (snatch): Belarus' Hanna Batsiushka, 115.0 kg (August 18)
previous record of 113.5 kg was set in November 2003 by Batsiushk
Men's 56–62 kg (total): China's Shi Zhiyong, 325 kg (tied) (August 16)
record of 325 kg was set at 2000 Games by Nikolai Peshalov
Women's 63–69 kg (snatch): China's Liu Chunhong, 122.5 kg (August 19)
previous record of 120.0 kg was set in November 2003 by Liu
Women's 63–69 kg (clean and jerk): China's Liu Chunhong, 153.0 kg (August 19)
previous record of 152.5 kg was set in November 2003 by Liu
Women's 63–69 kg (total): China's Liu Chunhong, 275.0 kg (August 19)
previous record of 270.0 kg was set in November 2003 by Liu
Women's over 75 kg (clean and jerk): China's Tang Gonghong, 182.5 kg (August 21)
previous record of 175.0 kg was set in April 2004 by Tang
Women's over 75 kg (total): China's Tang Gonghong, 305.0 kg (August 21)
previous record of 302.5 kg was set in April 2004 by Tang
Men's over 105 kg (clean and jerk): Iran's Hossein Reza Zadeh, 263.5 kg (August 25)
previous record of 263.0 kg was set in November 2002 by Reza Zadeh

References

2004 Summer Olympics
2004 Summer Olympics